Georgi Stoyanov Ivanov (born 13 March 1985 in Sliven) is a Bulgarian shot putter. His personal best is 21.09 metres, achieved on 20 July 2013 in Ústí nad Labem.

He won the gold medals at the 2001 World Youth Championships and the 2004 World Junior Championships, and the bronze medal at the 2003 European Junior Championships. He also competed at the 2008 Olympic Games and 2012 Olympic Games without reaching the final.

Competition record

Notes

External links 

 
 
 

1985 births
Living people
Bulgarian male shot putters
Athletes (track and field) at the 2008 Summer Olympics
Athletes (track and field) at the 2012 Summer Olympics
Athletes (track and field) at the 2016 Summer Olympics
Olympic athletes of Bulgaria
Sportspeople from Sliven
World Athletics Championships athletes for Bulgaria
20th-century Bulgarian people
21st-century Bulgarian people